Sveti Trije Kralji v Slovenskih Goricah is a small village in the Municipality of Benedikt in northeastern Slovenia. The area is part of the traditional region of Styria. It is now included in the Drava Statistical Region.

The local church from which the settlement gets its name is dedicated to the Three Kings and belongs to the Parish of Benedict. It was first mentioned in written documents dating to 1445 and was expanded in the early 16th century.

References

External links

Sveti Trije Kralji v Slovenskih Goricah at Geopedia

Populated places in the Municipality of Benedikt